The Gadfly is Los Angeles hip-hop group LPG's third album. It was released on Uprok Records, a label also home at the time to artists Mars ILL and Peace 586.

 Intro
 Place Called Hip-Hop
 Me and My Cousin
 Old Emcees
 Interlude
 Record Keeps Spinning
 Never Did I
 Interlude
 Squad Car
 Liquid
 Interlude
 Read Me and Learn
 Interlude
 Wackness Like (featuring Raphi)
 Just Another Day
 In Your Mind
 Interlude
 Mistakes
 Uiznotanemcee
 Ins and Outs
 First to Fight (featuring Sev Statik)
 Respect Due
 Outro

2003 albums